Colotis lucasi, the giant orange-tip, is a butterfly in the family Pieridae. It is found on Madagascar. The habitat consists of forests, forest margins and unnatural grasslands.

References

Butterflies described in 1867
lucasi
Butterflies of Africa
Taxa named by Alfred Grandidier